Charles Morton Hastings (November 11, 1870August 3, 1934) was a professional baseball player who played pitcher in the Major Leagues in -. He would play for the Cleveland Spiders and Pittsburgh Pirates.

External links

1870 births
1934 deaths
Major League Baseball pitchers
Cleveland Spiders players
Pittsburgh Pirates players
19th-century baseball players
Kansas City Cowboys (minor league) players
Milwaukee Brewers (minor league) players
Kansas City Blues (baseball) players
Minneapolis Millers (baseball) players
Buffalo Bisons (minor league) players
Hartford Indians players
Wooden Nutmegs players
Worcester Hustlers players
New Orleans Pelicans (baseball) players
Concord Marines players
Baseball players from Ohio